Princess Tashiraka (? – fl. 531) was Empress of Japan as the consort of Emperor Keitai.

Daughter of Emperor Ninken and Princess Kasuga no Ōiratsume. Gave birth to one child.

Issue
, later Prince Ahohiko
Emperor Kinmei (欽明天皇)

Notes

Japanese empresses
Year of death missing
6th-century Japanese women
Japanese princesses